Pozitivna geografija (trans. Positive Geography) is the 1984 debut album from Serbian and former Yugoslav rock band Bajaga i Instruktori, released in 1984. Originally released as Momčilo Bajagić "Bajaga"'s solo album, the album was later included in Bajaga i Instruktori's official discography, as Bajagić recorded it with musicians with which he would later form Bajaga i Instruktori.

The album was polled in 1998 as the 37th on the list of 100 greatest Yugoslav rock and pop albums in the book YU 100: najbolji albumi jugoslovenske rok i pop muzike (YU 100: The Best albums of Yugoslav pop and rock music).

Background and recording
At the time of the album recording, Bajagić was still a member of the hard rock band Riblja Čorba.  His intention was to record a large number of songs he wrote and release them on an album, without leaving Riblja Čorba.

The songs were recorded during November and December 1983, in a rented apartment and in PGP-RTB's Studio V, with a help in production by Kornelije Kovač. The musicians that participated in the album recording which would later become a member of Bajaga i Instruktori, were Dejan Cukić (formerly of Bulevar, vocals), Miroslav Cvetković "Cvele" (formerly of Pop Mašina, bass guitar), Nikola Stamatović (formerly of Zebra, Suncokret, and Bulevar, guitar), and Vladimir Golubović (drums). Bajagić himself sung and played guitar on the album. The album also featured Nenad Stefanović "Japanac" on bass guitar, Dragan Jovanović "Krle" (formerly of Generacija 5) on guitar, Kire Mitrev (of KIM) on trombone, Suzana Petričević on vocals (on the song "Papaline", which was her singing debut), Ivan Švager on clarinet, Borislav Pavićević "Longa" on backing vocals, and the album producer Kornelije Kovač on keyboards and backing vocals, with the rhythm machine programming also done by him.

Track listing
All songs written by Momčilo Bajagić.

Compositions
In 2009, in an interview to journalist Aleksandar Arežina, Bajagić commented on the songs:

"Berlin"
"My dad was in the partisans when he was 16, from 1943 to 1944. He was a kid, and they were really into going to Berlin. But, as they travelled mostly by foot, by the time they reached some place in Austria, Berlin fell. The time when the song was written was the time before the fall of the Berlin Wall, and back then it had a completely different meaning."

"Mali slonovi"
"It is like it's written for kids, but I didn't write it as a children's song, although maybe it will be remembered as one."

"Poljubi me"
"It's my first good recording. I don't mean as a song, but as a recording. [...] It's one of the best songs from the album."

"Limene trube"
"I wanted to have a punk tune. So we made the trumpets sound a little steamed [...] The lyrics ‘people are running away, people are leaving’, I don't know why I wrote them back then. Certainly, something was in the air..."

"Znam čoveka"
"The lyrics are about a friend of mine from the neighborhood, from Zemun. He was a drummer, and he died a long time ago."

Although not stating it in this interview, Bajagić stated on other occasions that the song was dedicated to Dragan Đerić "Đera", his former bandmate from the bands Ofi and Glogov Kolac.

"Tekila - Gerila"
"At the time, there was a lot of talking about Sandinistas, a lot of fuss in Colombia, Peru [...] For me, 'Tekila - Gerila' was a nice way of seeing those things. Besides, I wanted a good excuse to do Latin music."

Marlena
"At the time I loved Lou Reed, and that sort of rock, and 'Marlena' sounded good with Marlene Dietrich. We had 'Berlin', so let's have Marlena."

"Kosooka"
"Exotic. We wanted to have that to. It's the only song I'm not satisfied with. Back then, I thought I was so smart, so I thought you could make a song with only one chord, E sharp. [Kornelije] Bata [Kovač] asked me 'Can't we use couple more chords', and I was like 'No, no, no! This is great, we're gonna do something completely minimalistic'."

"Tamara"
"'Tamara' had been written before I went to Russia. I have made a lot of mistakes. Neva and Hermitage are in Leningrad, and Bolshoi Theatre in Moscow. Tamara couldn't live in both Leningrad and Moscow. The Russians didn't complain, they thought it was cute. [ Dušan Mihajlović ] Spira thought we could find a chick to say something, anything, in Russian. But we couldn't find one with a good accent. [...] Spira remembered that the report about the water level is read in Russian on the radio, every day. So we recorded the chick on the radio reading a water level report! So in 'Tamara' you can hear that the Danube is this high at Bezdan, and that high at some other spot."

"Pustite me, druže"
"The oldest song in the album. I did it while the rest of the guys from [Riblja] Čorba were in the army. I didn't know what to do with myself, and I had the band Frka with [Miroslav Cvetković] Cvele. We had a free term at Enco Lesić's, so we recorded it, and it was in the show Rokenroler. There was even a story, I don't know who made those decisions, that it should have appeared on Paket aranžman, but the fact that I was Riblja Čorba guitarist prevailed. It is about an everyday experience of a long-haired teenager in Belgrade."

"Papaline"
"I didn't know Suzana Petričević before that. Spira said that he had a friend who can sing. The song was a joke [...] 'Papaline' were funny to people from Belgrade as well as to people from Zagreb. [...] The idea of the song was that all love songs are 'slimy and disgusting', so I thought about what could be small and slimy."

Personnel
Momčilo Bajagić - guitar, vocals

Future members of Bajaga i Instruktori
Dejan Cukić - backing vocals
Miroslav Cvetković - bass guitar, backing vocals
Nenad Stamatović - guitar
Vladimir Golubović - drums, percussion

Others
Kornelije Kovač - producer, keyboards, drum programming, backing vocals
Suzana Petričević - vocals (on "Papaline")
Nenad Stefanović - bass guitar
Dragan Jovanović - guitar
Kire Mitrev - trombone
Ivan Švager - clarinet
Borislav Pavićević - backing vocals
Zoran Radetić - recorded by

Reception and legacy
The album was well received by both audience and the critics, with "Berlin", "Mali slonovi", "Limene trube", "Poljubi me" "Tekila - Gerila", "Marlena" and  "Tamara" all becoming huge hits. The Album marked Bajagić's breakthrough, as an solo artist, with 400'000 copies sold. He initially did not want to perform songs from the album live, but was persuaded to hold several concerts. He and some of the musicians who participated in the album recording (including the album's producer Kornelije Kovač) held their first concert on April 12, 1984, in Zagreb club Kulušić. On April 21, they (without Kovač) performed in Belgrade's Dom sindikata, performing as Bajaga i Instruktori (after the idea of the journalist Peca Popović) for the first time. The concert was well visited (mostly by teenagers) and the band's performance was well received.

The success Bajagić had with his songs caused conflicts inside Riblja Čorba, and in July, he was excluded from the band. He continued his career as the leader of Bajaga i Instruktori.

In 1998, the album was polled as the 37th on the list of 100 greatest Yugoslav rock and pop albums in the book YU 100: najbolji albumi jugoslovenske rok i pop muzike (YU 100: The Best albums of Yugoslav pop and rock music).

References 

Pozitivna geografija at Discogs
 EX YU ROCK enciklopedija 1960-2006,  Janjatović Petar;

External links 
Pozitivna geografija at Discogs

Momčilo Bajagić albums
Bajaga i Instruktori albums
1984 debut albums
PGP-RTB albums